Dorin Liviu Chubby Zaharia (September 25, 1944 – December 3, 1987) was a Romanian musician, composer, poet, essayist, and philosopher.

A "completely unclassifiable", "nearly mythical figure", Zaharia was an autodidact in all he undertook (he studied for about two years at the University of Bucharest's Faculty of Letters, and another two at the Faculty of Philosophy, without completing any of them).

Nicknamed "Chubby" (sometimes spelled as Ciabi) by his peers in the Popa Nan neighborhood because of his propensity to imitate Chubby Checker, Zaharia was the lead singer of Olympic '64, arguably one of the first Romanian bands interested in mixing Romanian folklore music with the popular music of the 1960s. Together with the other band members he composed the rock suites Decameronul focului alb ("The White Fire's Decameron", 1969) and Karma Kaliyuga (1971), but both are now considered lost, as no recordings have survived.

Zaharia was interested in Indian philosophy and mysticism, and he became the spiritual leader, the "shaman", of a group of friends, the so-called Group of Seven (consisting of Ioan Petru Culianu, Dorin Liviu Zaharia, Şerban Anghelescu, Dumitru Radu Popa, Victor Ivanovici, Silviu Angelescu şi Paul Drogeanu). Zaharia was used as a model by Ioan Petru Culianu in two short stories, Oglinda ovală ("The Oval Mirror",1970) and Istoria III ("History III, 1971).

Family
Zaharia was married to Magdalena Hofmann-Soare, an artist, with whom he had a daughter, Maria. He is buried in Berca. Andrei Oisteanu mentions his wife as "Magda Zaharia".

Discography
 Cântic de Haiduc/Ziua Bradului de Noapte

Film scores
Together, with Dan Andrei Aldea or with others, he composed and interpreted, wholly or partly, the music for several movies, such as:

Films directed by Dan Pița and Mircea Veroiu
Nunta de piatră (1973)
Duhul Aurului (1974)
Filip cel Bun (1975)
Tănase Scatiu (1976)

Films directed by Ioan Cărmăzan
Ţapinarii (1982) 
Lisca (1983)

Film directed by Iulian Mihu
Lumina palidă a durerii (1981)

Incidental music
Piticul din gradina de vara, (1972, directed by Peter Bokor)
Macbeth (1976, at the "Toma Caragiu" Theater, Ploiesti, with Gunther Reininger and Mircea Florian)
Muntele (1978, directed by Emil Mandrci and Nae Cosmescu) 
Mihai Viteazul (1979, Teatrul Tineretului, Piatra Neamt, directed by Alexandru Dabija)
Diavolul si bunul Dumnezeu (1981, at Teatrul Mic, Bucharest)

Actor
Nunta de piatră (1973)
Dincolo de pod (directed by Mircea Veroiu)

References

Bibliography
 Ionescu, Doru, Club A 42 de ani- Muzica tinertii tale,  Casa de pariuri literare, 2011, pp. 107–114
 Ionescu, Doru, Timpul chitarelor electrice. Jurnal de Călătorie în Arhiva TVR, Humanitas Educaţional, București, 2006, 
 Caraman-Fotea, Daniela and Nicolau, Cristian, Rock, Pop, Folk... remix, Humanitas Educaţional, București, 2003, 
 Andrei Oisteanu, Dorin Liviu (Chubby) Zaharia. Dupa douazeci de ani, 22, 12 Decembrie, 2007

External links

1944 births
1987 deaths
Romanian male film actors
Romanian film score composers
Romanian musicians
20th-century Romanian male actors
20th-century composers